Velika Kopanica is a village and municipality in Brod-Posavina County, Croatia.

There are a total of 3,308 inhabitants, in the following settlements:
 Beravci, population 815
 Divoševci, population 296
 Kupina, population 269
 Mala Kopanica, population 166
 Velika Kopanica, population 1,762 

99% declare themselves Croats (2011 census).

Velika Kopanica is also the birthplace of the great 19th century Croatian educational pedagogist Ivan Filipović.

References

External links
 

Municipalities of Croatia
Populated places in Brod-Posavina County